Anelaphus debilis is a species of beetle in the family Cerambycidae. It was described by John Lawrence LeConte in 1854.

References

Anelaphus
Beetles described in 1854